The accessory cuneate nucleus is located lateral to the cuneate nucleus in the medulla oblongata at the level of the sensory decussation (the crossing fibers of the posterior column/medial lemniscus tract).

It receives sensory input about position and movement (proprioception) from the upper limb by way of  cervical spinal nerves and transmits that information to the cerebellum.

These fibers are called cuneocerebellar (cuneate nucleus → cerebellum) fibers.

In this function, the accessory cuneate nucleus is the upper extremity equivalent of  Clarke's column, also called the nucleus thoracicus, which is the source of  spinocerebellar connections for proprioception from the lower limb.

Additional images

References

External links
 NIF Search - Accessory Cuneate Nucleus via the Neuroscience Information Framework

Medulla oblongata